Müderris is a term that described the religious scholar, professor or faculty member in the Seljuk's world and the Ottoman Empire.Cambridge University Press, History of Turkey Vol. 3, The Later Ottoman Empire 1603-1839 (2006), s.216

In Arabic, the word "müderris" means teacher of lesson, describing the teacher who teaches and the scholar who is authorized to give lessons. After completing the education and training in the local schools of the provinces, and after having received the diploma, the teachers would teach the religion and sciences in madressas were they were called müderris, the profession was called müderrislik.

See also
 List of Ottoman titles and appellations

References

Islamic terminology
Ottoman titles
Turkish words and phrases
Civil servants from the Ottoman Empire
Arabic words and phrases
Titles in Bosnia and Herzegovina during Ottoman period